Hypena lividalis is a moth of the family Erebidae. It has an Afrotropical and possibly Circumtropical distribution. It is known from the western parts of the Palearctic realm and the Neotropical realm. It is a rare migrant in western, central and northern Europe. In the Mediterranean sclerophyllous forest zone it is widespread and often abundant. In the Levant it has been recorded from Lebanon, Jordan, and Israel.

Adults are on wing year round. There are multiple generations per year.

The larvae feed on Parietaria and Urtica species.

References

External links

Fauna Europaea
Lepiforum e. V.

lividalis
Moths described in 1796
Moths of Europe
Owlet moths of Africa
Moths of Cape Verde
Moths of Madagascar
Moths of Africa
Moths of the Middle East
Taxa named by Jacob Hübner